India has several Special Forces (SF) units. The three branches of the Indian Armed Forces have separate special forces units, viz. the Para SF of the Indian Army, the MARCOS of the Indian Navy and the Garud Commando Force of the Indian Air Force. There are other special forces which are not controlled by the military but operate under civilian organisations such as the Home Ministry’s National Security Guard and Research and Analysis Wing's Special Group (India). Small groups from the military SF units are deputed in the Armed Forces Special Operations Division, a unified command and control structure.

The Research and Analysis Wing, the external Intelligence agency of India, has separate special forces under its control, namely the Special Group and the Special Frontier Force.

Indian Army

Para (Special Forces)

The Paratrooper (Special Forces), or Para (SF), are the special forces of the Indian Army.
This unit was created in June 1966 in the aftermath of the 1965 Indo-Pakistani war. An impromptu commando unit called Meghdoot Force, which took part in the 1965 war, formed the first nucleus of the permanent Para commando battalion which was to be raised under the Parachute Regiment. By 1969, the unit had grown into 2 battalions, viz. the 9 Para and the 10 Para. The unit's first combat missions were conducted during the 1971 Indo-Pakistani war in which they undertook raids against Pakistan's military.

In 1988,  6 Para spearheaded the only foreign intervention operation conducted by Indian Armed Forces to restore democracy in Maldives. The operation was code named  Operation Cactus. Operation Cactus was launched to thwart a coup against the government of president Maumoon Abdul Gayoom. In the late 1980s, the Para (SF) were deployed in Sri Lanka where they conducted helicopter-borne assaults and security operations.

Since the 1990s, the Para (SF) have been deployed on counter-terrorism operations in the Kashmir region against insurgents. These operations include raids and ambushes. In 1999, Para (SF) undertook operations against Pakistan’s military during the Kargil war which included raids against Pakistani infantry and special forces. In 2002, the 2 Para (SF) participated in Operation Khukri in Sierra Leone to rescue 223 soldiers of the Indian Army's 5/8 Gorkha Rifles who were deployed as UN peacekeepers but were surrounded by militants from the Revolutionary United Front of Sierra Leone. Some of the later reported missions carried out by Para (SF) include the counter-insurgency operation purportedly undertaken inside Myanmar in 2015, and the 2016 Surgical Strikes.

The list of PARA (SF) Battalions is as follows:

 1 PARA (SF) "Red Devils" 
 2 PARA (SF) "Predators" 
 3 PARA (SF) "Russell's Vipers" 
 4 PARA (SF) "Mighty Daggers" 
 5 PARA (SF) "Maroon 5th" 
 6 PARA (SF) "Sakht Para"
 7 PARA (SF) "SE7EN"
 9 PARA (SF) "Mountain Rats/Ghost Operators/Pirates" 
 10 PARA (SF) "Desert Scorpions" 
 11 PARA (SF) "Helleven" 
 12 PARA (SF) "Dirty Dozens" 
 13 PARA (SF) "Thunderbolts" 
 21 PARA (SF) "Waghnakhs" 
 23 PARA (SF) "Devil's Own" 
 29 PARA (SF) "Airborne Rajputs"

Indian Navy

MARCOS

First conceived in 1985, the Marine Commando Force, also called MARCOS, was raised in February 1987. It is the special forces unit of the Indian Navy. Initially, the U.S. Navy SEALs and British special forces trained a few officers of the Indian navy who formed the first core of MARCOS. Months after their creation, MARCOS were deployed in Sri Lanka against the Liberation Tigers of Tamil Eelam (LTTE) in July 1987. In the 1990s, MARCOS undertook numerous operations such as Operation Tasha (1991) against the LTTE, Operation Zabardust (1992) against a ship that was smuggling arms and in support of the United Nations in Somalia (1993). They also participated in the 1999 Kargil War. Since 1995, MARCOS are permanently deployed for counter-terrorism operations in Jammu and Kashmir against militants. MARCOS had participated in efforts against the 2008 Mumbai attacks alongside the National Security Guards but their effectiveness was diluted due to bureaucratic indecision. MARCOS have also been deployed in anti-piracy operations.

After a 10 week long basic training, MARCOS are sent to train alongside Indian Army’s Para (SF) for 3 weeks. Advanced training follows, during which MARCOS learn skills such as sky-diving, weapons training, counter-insurgency, languages and warfare in different terrains, among other things. Each MARCOS squad, called Prahar, is composed of 8 soldiers.

Some of the responsibilities of MARCOS are-

 Providing support to Amphibious operations.
 Special surveillance and reconnaissance operations.
 Clandestine operations inside hostile territory, including diving operations and raids.
 Counter-terrorism operations.

Indian Air Force

Garud Commando Force
The Garud commandos are the special forces of the Indian Air Force (IAF). Their tasks include counter-terrorism, hostage rescue, providing security to IAF’s  assets and various air force-specific special operations. First conceived in 2002, this unit was officially established on February 6, 2004.

All Garuds are volunteers who are imparted a 52-week basic training, which includes a three-month probation followed by special operations training, basic airborne training and other warfare and survival skills. The last phase of basic training sees Garuds been deployed to get combat experience. Advanced training follows, which includes specialised weapons training.

The mandated tasks of the Garuds include direct action, special reconnaissance, rescuing downed pilots in hostile territory, establishing airbases in hostile territory and providing air-traffic control to these airbases. The Garuds also undertake suppression of enemy air defences and the destruction of other enemy assets such as radars, evaluation of the outcomes of Indian airstrikes and use laser designators to guide Indian airstrikes.

The security of IAF installations and assets are usually performed by the Air Force Police and the Defence Security Corps even though some critical assets are protected by the Garuds.

Research and Analysis Wing

Special Group 

The Special Group is a special forces unit of the Research and Analysis Wing. It was formed in 1981. The responsibilities of the Special Group includes clandestine intelligence operations and covert operations, with which the Government of India may not wish to be overtly associated.

Special Frontier Force 

The Special Frontier Force is a special forces unit of the Research and Analysis Wing which was created on 14 November 1962 to undertake operations against the Chinese People's Liberation Army. Based in Chakrata, Uttarakhand, SFF is also known as the Establishment 22. The force was put under the direct supervision of the Intelligence Bureau, and later, the Research and Analysis Wing, India's external intelligence agency. It consists primarily of Tibetan people who are tasked to undertake operations in the tough terrain of the Himalayas and Tibet, whose main goal was to conduct covert operations behind Chinese lines in case of another war between the China and Republic of India.

National Security Guard 
The National Security Guard (NSG) is a specialized counter-terrorism Federal Contingency Force. It was formally created in 1986. It is based on the British Army's Special Air Service and the German GSG 9. The NSG are popularly referred to as the 'Black Cats' due to their distinct black uniforms. It consists of the following two elements-

 SAG (Special Action Group), which recruits personnel from the Indian Army.
SRG (Special Rangers Group),  which recruits personnel from the Central Armed Police Forces.

In Popular Culture

Extraction (2020), a U.S. action-thriller film in which Randeep Hooda plays the role of Saju Rav, a Para SF veteran.
Uri: The Surgical Strike (2019) is a dramatised account of the tactical strikes conducted by the Para (Special Forces) on the camps of terrorists across the Line of Control in retaliation for the 2016 Uri attack.

See also
 Armed Forces Special Operations Division, Indian tri-services command at operational level

References